Gerrhonotus ophiurusis a species of lizard of the Anguidae family. It is found in Mexico.

References

Gerrhonotus
Reptiles of Mexico
Reptiles described in 1867
Taxa named by Edward Drinker Cope